Carmine Rojas (born February 14, 1953) is an American bass guitarist, musical director and composer. His musical styles include rock, R&B/funk, and jazz.

Music career

Early years, as sideman
Born in Brooklyn, Rojas toured the world with David Bowie from 1983 through 1987, playing bass on "Let's Dance", "China Girl", "Modern Love" and "Blue Jean".  Live DVDs include Serious Moonlight (1983) and Glass Spider (1987).

He recorded and toured with Julian Lennon as a musical director and bassist from 1985–1986.

He recorded and toured with Rod Stewart as a musical director and bass guitarist from 1988 through 2003. One of the multiple albums recorded during that time includes the MTV multi-platinum live CD and DVD, Unplugged...and Seated. He also co-wrote songs on the albums Vagabond Heart and A Spanner in the Works.

Carmine has also recorded, toured and played alongside Tina Turner, Keith Richards, Stevie Wonder, Ron Wood, Stevie Ray Vaughan, B.B. King, Mick Jagger, Eric Clapton, Joe Bonamassa, Eric Johnson, Peter Frampton, Al Green, Carly Simon, Ian Anderson, Paul Rogers, John Waite, Steve Winwood, Billy Joel, Herbie Hancock, Lee Ritenour, Julian Lennon (Musical Director/Bassist), Richie Sambora, Robert Randolph, Joe Don Rooney, Trace Adkins, Nancy Wilson, John Hiatt, Carole King, Beth Hart,  Bobby Womack, Sam Moore, Billy Squier, Rob Hyman & Eric Bazilian, Olivia Newton-John, Michael Hutchence, Bernard Fowler, Blondie Chaplin, Billy Gibbons, Leslie West, Joe Lynn Turner,  Carlos Santana, Todd Rundgren, Patti LaBelle, Nona Hendryx, Michael Bolton, Ivan Neville, Allen Toussaint, Phil Ramone, Kevin Shirley, Trevor Horn, Charlie Sexton,  Jewel, Brandy, Dave Mason, Mike Patton, Glenn Hughes, Nektar, Belouis Some, Tetsuya Komuro, Hitomi, Ziroq, Modern Primitives, Simranking, Sass Jordan, Alphaville and others.

Ziroq

in 1998, Rojas with Rock / Flamenco guitarist Marcos Nand sang lead vocals in both Spanish and English The both arranging & composing, formed the band Ziroq in Los Angeles. The band blends Spanish, rock, flamenco, and other eastern European influences. In 2001 the band released the full-length album Ziroq. David Beamish of DVDActive praised the "fiery, passionate performances."  A review by Mark Schwartz stated, "On their self-titled debut, Middle Eastern percussion, violin, and flamenco guitars take the fore, in counterpoint to Nand's smoky vocals."

In support of the album the band performed throughout the west coast, appearing at the Whole Earth Festival in April 2002. The 2002 Putamayo World Music compilation Regueton,  the Ziroq track "Que Peña," peaked at #11 on the Tropical/Salsa chart at Billboard.

Discography

With Joe Bonamassa
 You & Me (J&R Adventures, 2006)
 Sloe Gin (J&R Adventures, 2007)	
 The Ballad of John Henry (J&R Adventures, 2009)	
 Black Rock (J&R Adventures, 2010)
 Dust Bowl (J&R Adventures, 2011)
 Driving Towards the Daylight (Provogue Records, 2012)				
 Different Shades of Blue (Provogue Records, 2014)

With John Waite
 Mask of Smiles (EMI, 1985)

With Julian Lennon
 Valotte (Atlantic Records, 1984)
 The Secret Value of Daydreaming (Atlantic Records, 1986)

With Rod Stewart
 Vagabond Heart (Warner Bros. Records, 1991)
 A Spanner in the Works (Warner Bros. Records, 1995)

With Labelle
 Pressure Cookin' (RCA Records, 1973)
 Phoenix (Epic Records, 1975)
 Chameleon (Epic Records, 1976)

With Charlie Sexton
 Charlie Sexton (MCA Records, 1989)

With Beth Hart and Joe Bonamassa
 Don't Explain (J&R Adventures, 2011)
 Seesaw (J&R Adventures, 2013)

With Martin Briley
 Dangerous Moments (Mercury Records, 1984)

With Bernard Fowler
 Friends With Privileges (Sony, 2006)

With Alphaville
 Afternoons in Utopia (Atlantic, 1986)

With Nona Hendryx
 Nona Hendryx (Epic Records, 1977)
 Nona (RCA Records, 1983)

With Dave Mason
 Future's Past (Something Music, 2014)

With Sass Jordan
 Rats (Impact Records, 1994)

With David Bowie
 Let's Dance (EMI, 1983)
 Tonight (EMI, 1984)
 Never Let Me Down (EMI, 1987)

With Billy Squier
 Tell the Truth (Capitol Records, 1993)

With Tina Turner
 Foreign Affair (Capitol Records, 1989)

With Steve Taylor
 On the Fritz (Sparrow Records, 1985)

Further reading
 
 Carmine Rojas interviewed by Bass Player Magazine

References

External links
www.jbonamassa.com

American rock bass guitarists
American session musicians
1953 births
Living people
Musicians from Brooklyn
Guitarists from New York (state)
American male bass guitarists
20th-century American bass guitarists
20th-century American male musicians